Reima Nummila (16 November 1942 – 7 March 2015) was a Finnish footballer. He played in 19 matches for the Finland national football team from 1964 to 1968.

References

1942 births
2015 deaths
Finnish footballers
Finland international footballers
Place of birth missing
Association footballers not categorized by position